The 2003 Canberra Women's Classic was a women's tennis tournament played on outdoor hard courts at the National Sports Club in Canberra, Australia and was part of the Tier V category of the 2003 WTA Tour. It was the third edition of the tournament and was held from 6 through 12 January 2003. Second-seeded Meghann Shaughnessy won the singles title and earned $16,000 first-prize money.

Finals

Singles
 Meghann Shaughnessy defeated  Francesca Schiavone 6–1, 6–1
 It was Shaughnessy's 1st singles title of the year and the 3rd of her career.

Doubles
 Tathiana Garbin /  Émilie Loit defeated  Dája Bedáňová /  Dinara Safina 6–3, 3–6, 6–4

References

External links
 ITF tournament edition details
 Tournament draws

Canberra International
Canberra International
Canberra International